Eric Leslie Barker (12 February 1912 – 1 June 1990) was an English comedy actor. He is most remembered for his roles in the popular British Carry On films, although he only appeared in the early films in the series, apart from returning for Carry On Emmannuelle in 1978.

Career
Eric Barker was born in Thornton Heath, London, on 20 February 1912, the youngest of three children. He was brought up in Croydon, Surrey, and educated at Whitgift School. He joined his father's paper merchants' company in the city but left to concentrate full-time on writing. His first novel The Watch Hunt was published when he was eighteen. He wrote short stories and plays, appearing in the latter himself and gradually turned to writing and performing lyrics, revues and sketches for stage and on radio.

He later became one of the most familiar faces in British comedy in his day. Barker gained his renewed start in show business during the Second World War, when he was part of the armed forces radio show Merry Go Round, which he helped to write. After the war the show continued, alternating between Army, Royal Air Force and Royal Navy shows. The Navy show was named Waterlogged Spa, with Barker and his wife, actress Pearl Hackney. His "Steady Barker" catchphrase and verbal stumbling over words beginning with the letter "h" became well known to audiences. The show's success led to Barker's starring in other radio shows, where he achieved a sizeable following due to his versatility at doing voices.

In the 1950s, he moved into television and films. On television he wrote and appeared in his own show, The Eric Barker Half-Hour, a comedy sketch show on the BBC. As well as his wife, the cast included Nicholas Parsons and Deryck Guyler. The show ran for three series (21 episodes) between 1951 and 1953, and was broadcast fortnightly on Wednesdays around 9.00 pm. Such was Barker's success that it led to him writing his autobiography Steady Barker in 1956.

He had already appeared as an adult in nine films, including Carry On London, a 45-minute crime short in 1937. when in 1958 he received a BAFTA as "Most Promising Newcomer" for his role as a barrister's clerk in the film Brothers in Law (1957). The award led to more film work over the next 20 years, including three St Trinians films, and four in the classic Carry On British comedy film series. He found his niche in playing variations on the busybody sticking his nose in everyone's business, or as some authority figure, Carry On Constable (1960) being a good example. Along with Kenneth Williams and Kenneth Connor, he is the only actor to appear in the first, Carry On Sergeant in 1958, and the last of the original series of Carry On films, Carry On Emmannuelle in 1978. Barker's other Carry On appearance was in Carry On Spying (1964).

In that same year (1964) he appeared in the ITC filmed series Danger Man, playing the titular character in "The Ubiquitous Mr. Lovegrove". Barker took his "authoritarian busybody" characterisation to the limit, with the twist that Mr. Lovegrove existed only in spy John Drake's semi-unconscious mind after crashing his car on his way to the airport, inspired by one of the responding ambulance operators attending the scene of Drake's accident.

Barker was also a writer and published a number of novels: Sea Breezes in the early 1930s under the pen name of Christopher Bentley and Day Gone By under his own name in 1933, as well as Golden Gimmick in 1958 published by Hodder & Stoughton. According to P. G. Wodehouse, Barker had "a real talent for humorous writing".

Personal life
Barker married the actress Pearl Hackney (28 October 1916 – 18 September 2009) with whom he often worked, though she also had a comedy career of her own. They had a daughter, Petronella Barker, in 1942, who also appeared in films and television between 1964 and 1983.

In 1971, Barker was the subject of the British ITV television show This Is Your Life.

Barker died in Canterbury, Kent, and was buried in the churchyard of St. Mary's, Stalisfield Green, near Faversham, where he had lived for a number of years.

Partial filmography

 Tom Brown's Schooldays (1916) – Arthur
 Daddy (1917) – John, as a child
 Nelson (1918) – Nelson as a child
 His Dearest Possession (1919) – Charlie Lobb
 The Toilers (1919) – Jack as a child
 Sheba (1919) – Rex Ormatroyd
 On Velvet (1938) 
 The World Owes Me a Living (1945) – Chuck Rockley
 Brothers in Law (1957) – Alec Blair
 Blue Murder at St Trinian's (1957) – Culpepper Brown
 A Clean Sweep (1958) – George Watson
 Happy Is the Bride (1958) – Vicar
 Carry On Sergeant (1958) – Captain Potts
 Bachelor of Hearts (1958) – Aubrey Murdock
 Left Right and Centre (1959) – Bert Glimmer
 Carry On Constable (1960) – Inspector Mills
 Dentist in the Chair (1960) – The Dean
 Watch Your Stern (1960) – Capt. David Foster
 The Pure Hell of St Trinian's (1960) – Culpepper-Brown
 Nearly a Nasty Accident (1961) – The Air Minister
 Dentist on the Job (1961) – Colonel J.J. Proudfoot / The Dean
 Raising the Wind (1961) – Dr. Morgan Rutherford
 On the Fiddle (1961) – Doctor
 The Fast Lady (1962) – Wentworth
 On the Beat (1962) – Police Doctor
 The Mouse on the Moon (1963) – M.I.5. Man
 Heavens Above! (1963) – Bank Manager
 Father Came Too! (1963) – Mr. Gallagher
 The Bargee (1964) – Mr. Parkes, the Foreman
 Carry On Spying (1964) – The Chief
 TV series Gideon's Way episode How To Retire Without Really Working (1964) as petty crook and devoted husband Robert Gresham
 Ferry Cross the Mersey (1965) – Col. Dawson
 Those Magnificent Men in Their Flying Machines (1965) – French Postman
 Doctor in Clover (1966) – Prof. Halfbeck
 The Great St Trinian's Train Robbery (1966) – Culpepper Brown
 Three Hats for Lisa (1966) – Station Sergeant
 Maroc 7 (1967) – Prof. Bannen
 Twinky (1969) – Tight Scottish Clerk
 Cool It Carol! (1970) – Signalman
 There's a Girl in My Soup (1970) – Wedding Guest (uncredited)
 That's Your Funeral (1972) – Pusher
 Carry On Emmannuelle (1978) – Ancient General (final film role)

Notes

External links

1912 births
1990 deaths
Burials in Kent
English male film actors
English male silent film actors
English male television actors
English male radio actors
People from Thornton Heath
20th-century English male actors
People educated at Whitgift School
BAFTA Most Promising Newcomer to Leading Film Roles winners
People from Stalisfield Green